The 1967 European Karate Championships, the 2nd edition, was held in the sports complex of Crystal Palace in London, England, from May 2 to 4, 1967.

Medalists

Medal table

References

1967
International sports competitions in London
European Karate Championships
European championships in 1967
European Karate Championships
Karate competitions in the United Kingdom